The 2001 Exxon Superflo 12 Hours of Sebring was the 49th running of this event.  It was both the second round of the 2001 American Le Mans Series season and the opening round of the new European Le Mans Series.  It took place at Sebring International Raceway, Florida, on March 17, 2001.

French Porsche driver and ambassador Bob Wollek was killed nearby the circuit following a practice session.  Wollek had been riding a bicycle along a nearby highway when he was struck by a van.  A minute of silence was held prior to the start of the race.  Wollek's team, Petersen Motorsports, withdrew from the event out of respect.

This would not only be the final victory of Michele Alboreto's lifetime but also his final race ever as he died one month later.

Official results
Class winners in bold.

† - #47 Broadfoot Racing was disqualified during the race for making an illegal repair to their car.  #34 Orbit was disqualified during the race for receiving outside assistance while still on the track.

Statistics
 Pole Position - #2 Audi Sport North America - 1:49.477
 Fastest Lap - #2 Audi Sport North America - 1:49.666
 Distance - 2203.192 km
 Average Speed - 183.438 km/h

References

External links
 
 World Sports Racing Prototypes - Race Results

Sebring
Sebring
12 Hours of Sebring
12 Hours of Sebring
12 Hours Of Sebring
12 Hours Of Sebring